The Ontario Energy Board regulates natural gas and electricity utilities in the province of Ontario, Canada. This includes setting rates, and licensing all participants in the electricity sector including the Independent Electricity System Operator (IESO), generators, transmitters, distributors, wholesalers and electricity retailers, as well as natural gas marketers who sell to low volume customers.

To ensure an adequate level of consumer protection in the energy markets, the Board developed codes of conduct for gas marketers and electricity retailers, and established a complaint resolution process for energy consumers. The Board also provides a broad range of information to energy consumers about electricity and natural gas in Ontario.

The Board oversees the electricity market and ensures regulated gas and electricity monopoly utilities comply with Board decisions and orders. This includes conducting audits, performing compliance monitoring activities and monitoring various aspects of the gas and electricity utilities’ financial operating performance.

Electricity
In the electricity sector, the Board sets transmission and distribution rates, and approves the IESO's budget and fees. The Board also sets the regulated price of electricity for residential and small business consumers on the Regulated Price Plan. Consumers who have signed contracts with an electricity retailer will pay the price set out in their contract.
The Board licenses all electricity retailers who sell electricity to residential and small commercial consumers.

Prior approval by the Board is required for: 
 Construction of electricity transmission lines longer than two kilometres;
 Amalgamation between an electricity distributor and another company; 
 Acquisition of a significant shareholding (in excess of 20 per cent of the voting securities) of an electricity transmission or distribution company; 
 Disposal of electricity transmission or distribution assets; 
 Acquisition of electricity transmission or distribution assets by an electricity generation company or affiliate; and 
 Acquisition of electricity generation facilities by an electricity transmission or distribution company or affiliate.

The Board also monitors markets in the electricity sector and reports to the Minister of Energy and Infrastructure on the efficiency, fairness, transparency and competitiveness of the markets, and reports any abuse or potential abuse of market power. The Board may also be asked to review the IESO market rules and consider appeals of IESO orders.

Natural gas
In the natural gas sector, utilities are required to submit the rates they propose to charge their customers to the Board for review. The Board approves rates associated with the cost to transport, store and distribute natural gas from utilities to consumers as well as charges to administer natural gas accounts. The Board also approves the price utilities can charge consumers for the natural gas they use. Natural gas utilities do not make a profit on the sale of natural gas. It is sold to consumers with no mark-up. Consumers who have signed contracts with a natural gas marketer will pay the price set out in their contract.

The Board licenses all natural gas marketers who sell natural gas to residential and small commercial consumers.

The Board is required to determine if constructing a natural gas pipeline is in the public interest by considering need, safety, economic feasibility, community benefits, security of supply and environmental impacts. Each municipality may grant a gas utility the right to deliver gas service and use road allowances or utility easements within its borders. The specific terms and conditions of these franchise agreements between the municipality and the utility are subject to Board approval.

The Board also reviews applications by gas distributors to create and operate underground gas storage areas and designates geological formations suitable to store natural gas in Ontario. 
Board approval is also required before a natural gas utility can sell its distribution system or amalgamate with another distributor.

There are currently two default service providers of natural gas in Ontario, Enbridge and Union Gas. These two entities are regulated by the Board.
The Board does not regulate competitive services in the natural gas sector.  These include the sale of natural gas, water heater rentals and repair or maintenance services. These products and services are competitive services and can be obtained from various companies.

See also
Independent Electricity System Operator
Electricity policy of Ontario

References

External links
OEB Website
Independent Electricity System Operator
Ontario Energy Board Act, 1998

Ontario electricity policy
Ontario government departments and agencies
Crown corporations of Ontario
Ontario government tribunals
Energy regulatory authorities
Regulators of Canada